The grand title of the emperor of Austria was the official list of the crowns, titles, and dignities which the emperors of Austria carried from the foundation of the empire in 1804 until the end of the monarchy in 1918.

After the House of Habsburg established itself in the 11th century, it grew in power. Various domains were added to its empire in central, eastern and western Europe. The throne of the Holy Roman Empire was continuously occupied by the Habsburgs between 1438 and 1740, and again between 1745 and the dissolution of the Holy Roman Empire in 1806. The house also produced kings of Bohemia, Germany, Hungary, Croatia, Portugal, Spain, England and Ireland, as well as rulers of several Dutch and Italian principalities amongst many others.

The Austrian Empire was declared as the Holy Roman Empire dissolved itself and became a successor state. The former Holy Roman Emperor Francis II became the Emperor of Austria. In accordance with tradition and the titles that were already held, he promulgated the grand title to codify the most important monarchical titles of various countries and territories under Habsburg rule, and also of titular rulers of former possessions. With the Austro-Hungarian Compromise of 1867 the grand title was again slightly modified. Although the Austrian emperor was also the nominal head of the German Confederation, this was not included in the grand title.

The grand title was not a complete listing of all the titles held; instead it ends with an etc. There were also a middle title and a small title. The empress was also given the feminine version of the title.

Grand title 
The full title (in German) of the Austro-Hungarian monarch as of 1914 was:

which translates to:

Explanation of the individual titles listed in the grand title in their order

Emperor of Austria
In 1804 Holy Roman Emperor Francis II foresaw the dissolution of the Holy Roman Empire, so he sought to preserve his family's imperial status by creating the new title "Hereditary Emperor of Austria".

Apostolic King of Hungary, King of Bohemia
The kingdoms of Hungary and Bohemia were originally elective monarchies, but like many elective monarchies heredity was respected. Ferdinand, the future Holy Roman Emperor, married the daughter of King Vladislaus II (who held both kingdoms), and when Vladislaus' son died Ferdinand was elected in 1526. Eventually his descendants made the throne hereditary.

King of Dalmatia
Dalmatia became a crown land of the Habsburgs with the Treaty of Campo Formio and finally following Napoleon's defeat. It was previously claimed by the Habsburg emperors in their capacity as kings of Hungary and Croatia, as it was part of the Croatian and later Hungarian royal title since the High Middle Ages.

King of Croatia
In 1102 the Croatian nobles agreed to share the same King as Hungary. In 1527 Ferdinand I was elected king, and the title made hereditary.

King of Slavonia
In the 1490s king Vladislaus II of Hungary officially included Slavonia into the royal title. In 1526 when Ferdinand I was elected king he inherited the title and passed it to his descendants.

King of Galicia and Lodomeria
Galicia and Lodomeria was annexed by Austria in the First Partition of Poland, creating a new kingdom for the Habsburgs. The title had been claimed by the Kings of Hungary in the Middle Ages.

King of Illyria
With the re-annexation of the Illyrian provinces in 1815 the Habsburgs created a new crown land. Although abolished in 1848, the title was kept.

King of Jerusalem
The Kingdom of Jerusalem was abolished upon its conquest by the Egyptian Mamluks in 1291 AD. The Habsburgs were one of many dynasties to claim the title. They inherited it through the House of Lorraine. In the 18th century, the title was added by Leopold I of Lorraine, Francis I's father, in order to claim a royal title.

Archduke of Austria
In 1282 King Rudolf I of Germany enfeoffed his sons with the Duchies of Austria and Styria. His descendant Frederick III, Holy Roman Emperor officially elevated it to an archduchy in 1453, confirming a 1356 forgery by Duke Rudolf IV.

Grand Duke of Tuscany
Following the War of the Polish Succession, future Holy Roman Emperor Francis I was forced to exchange his native Duchy of Lorraine for the Grand Duchy of Tuscany. He later passed the grand duchy to a younger son, but the main branch of the House of Habsburg-Lorraine continued to use the title.

Grand Duke of Kraków
The Free City of Kraków was incorporated into the Austrian Empire in 1846 following the Kraków Uprising, and transformed in a crown land under the name of Grand Duchy of Cracow. It was later incorporated into Galicia.

Duke of Lorraine
The male line of the original House of Habsburg went extinct with Charles VI, Holy Roman Emperor. His daughter Maria Theresa married the aforementioned Francis, Duke of Lorraine (later Emperor Franics I), and their progeny became the House of Habsburg-Lorraine.

Duke of Styria
Rudolf I of Germany enfeoffed one of his sons as Duke of Styria. The title passed down to the Leopoldian line, which became the sole remaining branch of the House of Habsburg after the death of king Ladislas the Posthumous, last descendant of the senior, Albertinian line.

Duke of Carinthia
In 1335 Otto, Duke of Austria was enfeoffed as Duke of Carinthia. The title passed down with the Leopoldinian line.

Duke of Carniola
The March of Carniola was part of the Habsburg domains since Rudolf I of Germany, although it was leased to the House of Gorizia until 1335. In 1364, duke Rudolf IV of Austria elevated it to a duchy. The title passed down the Leopoldinian line. After the death of Ferdinand I, the Inner Austrian domains (Carniola, Styria and Carinthia) were passed down to a junior branch which in 1619 finally reunited all the Austrian Habsburg lands.

Duke of Bukovina
In 1775 the Habsburgs annexed the northernmost part of the Principality of Moldavia and created the Duchy of Bukovina out of it.

Grand Prince of Transylvania
In the 16th century Transylvania was conquered by the Ottomans from Hungary and created as a separate principality.  In 1711 the Habsburgs reclaimed it and added the Principality of Transylvania to their titles. In 1765 it was elevated to a Grand Principality.

Margrave of Moravia
Moravia was a Crown Land of Bohemia; thus when the Habsburgs became Kings of Bohemia they also acquired Moravia.

Duke of Upper and Lower Silesia
Silesia was originally owned by the Kingdom of Poland, but it was gradually broken up and acquired by Bohemia as a crown land. After losing most of historic Silesia to Prussia in the Silesian Wars, the Habsburgs consolidated what remained into Upper and Lower Silesia.

Duke of Modena
Maria Beatrice Ricciarda d'Este, daughter of the last Duke of the House of Este, married Archduke Ferdinand of Austria-Este, allowing this title to pass to the Habsburgs. It was subsequently lost to Sardinia during the unification of Italy.

Duke of Parma, Piacenza, and Guastalla
Charles VI, Holy Roman Emperor acquired the Duchy of Parma after the War of the Polish Succession, but his daughter Maria Theresa lost it after the War of the Austrian Succession.

Duke of Auschwitz and Zator
Historically one of the duchies of Silesia, it was acquired by the Polish kings in the 16th century and incorporated into the Polish-Lithuanian Commonwealth. The Habsburgs acquired this title in the First Partition of Poland.

Duke of Teschen
The Duchy of Teschen was one of the Silesian Duchies that were part of the Bohemian Crown Lands. It was granted to Leopold I, Duke of Lorraine as a compensation for Mantua and Monferrato. When Leopold's son Francis I married Maria Theresa of Austria, the title returned to the House of Habsburg-Lorraine.

Duke of Friaul
This title was created by Maximilian I during the Italian wars in the early 16th century. Friuli had been part of the Holy Roman Empire, but it was lost to the Republic of Venice in 1420. The title was created in order to strengthen the Emperor's claim to the region, but the Habsburgs acquired Friuli only in 1797 with the Treaty of Campo Formio, and then again after Napoleon's defeat. It was lost to Italy in 1866.

Duke of Ragusa
Ragusa (modern-day Dubrovnik) was a maritime republic, which in the late Middle Ages recognized the suzerainty of the Hungarian kings. It was abolished by Napoleon in 1808 and incorporated to Austrian Dalmatia after his defeat, when the title was created.

Duke of Zara
Zara (or Zadar) is a city in Dalmatia, modern-day Croatia. In the Middle Ages, it was contested between the Kingdom of Hungary and the Republic of Venice. It was considered an integral part of the Kingdom of Dalmatia by both parts, but the title was assumed by the Hungarian kings in order to assert their rights over the city. It became a Habsburg domain for the first time with the Treaty of Campo Formio in 1797, and then again in 1813 after Napoleon's defeat.

Princely Count of Habsburg
Habsburg was the original seat of the House of Habsburg.

Princely Count of Tyrol
Duke Rudolf IV of Austria acquired the County of Tyrol in 1363.

Princely Count of Kyburg
Rudolf I of Germany claimed the County of Kyburg when its ruling dynasty went extinct. A brief period of rule by the city of Zürich became permanent from 1452 when it was used as collateral for a loan the Habsburgs never repaid; they continued to use the title despite no longer being in possession of the land.

Princely Count of Gorizia and Gradisca
The Habsburgs acquired the County of Gorizia (German ) in 1500. In 1647, the nearby town of Gradisca and the surrounding area on the right bank of the Isonzo river was elevated to an immediate status and given to the Eggenberg family as a Principality. After its extinction in 1754, it was again merged with Gorizia.

Prince of Trent
In the 1300s Trent was annexed by Tyrol and thus was controlled by the Habsburgs.

Prince of Brixen
In 1803 the Prince-Bishopric of Brixen was secularized and annexed by the Habsburgs.

Margrave of Upper and Lower Lusatia
Lusatia was a Crown Land of Bohemia.

Margrave in Istria
Central Istria was acquired by the Habsburgs in the late 14th century. In 1466, they acquired the eastern parts, as well, and added their Istrian possessions to the Duchy of Carniola. With the annexation of Venetian Istria in 1797, the Habsburgs joined all their Istrian possessions into one unit and revived this title which had been abandoned in the late 13th century.

Count of Hohenems
When the male line of the original counts of Hohenems died out in 1759 the county came under suzerainty of the House of Habsburg.

Count of Feldkirch
When the last count of Feldkirch Frederick VII of Toggenburg died in 1436 the county passed back under the suzerainty of the House of Habsburg.

Count of Bregenz
After 1451 the title of count of Bregenz was held by the House of Habsburg and Bregenz was incorporated into the duchy of Austria.

Count of Sonnenberg
Sonnenberg was a partition of Waldburg and was annexed by the Archduchy of Austria in 1511.

Lord of Trieste
By the Peace of Turin in 1381, Venice renounced its claim to Trieste and the leading citizens of Trieste petitioned Leopold III of Habsburg, Duke of Austria, to make Trieste part of his domains.

Lord of Cattaro
After the Treaty of Campo Formio in 1797, it passed to the Habsburg Monarchy. However, in 1805, it was assigned to the French Empire's client state, the Napoleonic Kingdom of Italy by the Treaty of Pressburg, although in fact held by a Russian squadron under Dmitry Senyavin. It was restored to the Habsburg Monarchy by the Congress of Vienna.

Lord on the Windic March
Since the 11th century, Carniola was known under the double name of Carniola and the Windic March. In 1282, a cadet branch of the House of Gorizia was enfeoffed with part of the region, which became known as the County in Metlika and in the Windic March. In 1374, the county was acquired to the House of Habsburg who assumed the title of Lords of the Windic March.

Grand Voivode of the Voivodeship of Serbia
The Voivodeship was formed by a decision of the Austrian Emperor in November 1849, after the Revolutions of 1848/1849. It was formed in accordance with privilege given to Serbs by the Habsburg emperor in 1691, recognizing the right of Serbs to territorial autonomy within the Habsburg Monarchy.

Subsequent use
After 1918, the grand title was invoked for historical commemorative reasons in two Habsburg burial ceremonies in Vienna.

At the burial of the last empress, Zita (1916–1918), on 1 April 1989 in the imperial mausoleum, three prayers were said for the deceased by a speaker commissioned by the family, before the gate was opened and the sarcophagus was borne into the mausoleum. The first prayer started with the feminine form of the grand title: "Zita, Empress of Austria, crowned Queen of Hungary, Queen of Bohemia ...". In the list of ducal titles, the title of Duchess of Parma claimed by the Habsburgs was omitted, as she had a closer tie to Parma. Her father, Robert of Parma, was the last Duke of Parma (1854-1860) and as a pretender to that title she was a princess, even though she was not born until 1892. Thus the title ended with "Infanta of Spain, Princess of Portugal and of Parma".

Zita's son Otto von Habsburg was buried on 16 July 2011, and a prayer was said in the mausoleum: "Otto of Austria, first Crown Prince of Austria-Hungary, royal prince of Hungary and Bohemia ..." The titles of King of Jerusalem and Archduke of Austria were omitted. No Austrian emperor was actually sovereign over Jerusalem, and in 1961 Otto had renounced all claims of sovereignty in the Republic of Austria.

See also

List of rulers of Austria
List of Austrian consorts
List of heirs to the Austrian throne
History of Austria

Notes

Noble titles
Imperial titles
Austria-Hungary